Ham Lock is a lock on the Kennet and Avon Canal, at Newbury, Berkshire, England.

Ham Lock was built between 1718 and 1723 under the supervision of the engineer John Hore of Newbury. The canal is administered by the Canal & River Trust. The lock has a rise/fall of 4 ft 2 in (1.27 m).

References

See also

Locks on the Kennet and Avon Canal

Locks on the Kennet and Avon Canal
Locks of Berkshire
1723 establishments in England
Buildings and structures completed in 1723